Kim F. Goetz (August 23, 1957 – March 17, 2008) was an American basketball player. He was nicknamed "The Long Ranger" due to his wide shooting range while playing for the San Diego State Aztecs.

Goetz began his collegiate career with the College of Southern Idaho Golden Eagles, where he led the team to its first NJCAA championship in 1976. He transferred to play for the San Diego State Aztecs in 1977, where he had an immediate impact as the team's leading scorer during his debut season. During his senior season, he led the Western Athletic Conference (WAC) in scoring with 20.5 points per game and earned a first-team All-WAC selection. In his final game with the team, he set an Aztecs scoring record with 44 points in a loss to the Utah Utes. Goetz became the first Aztecs player to surpass the 1,000 points mark in two seasons. He holds the school's record for career free-throw percentage while also ranking second in scoring average.

Goetz was selected by the New York Knicks as the 34th overall pick in the 1979 NBA draft but never played in the National Basketball Association (NBA). He stayed in California and worked as a special education teacher at San Pasqual High School in Escondido. Goetz died of an apparent heart attack. 

He was inducted into the College of Southern Idaho Hall of Fame in 2005 and the San Diego State Aztec Hall of Fame in 2006.

Career statistics

College

|-
| style="text-align:left;"| 1977–78
| style="text-align:left;"| San Diego State
| 28 || – || – || .514 || – || .803 || 2.8 || 1.9 || – || – || 16.9
|-
| style="text-align:left;"| 1978–79
| style="text-align:left;"| San Diego State
| 26 || 25 || – || .508 || – || .902 || 4.4 || 1.9 || 1.2 || .7 || 20.5
|- class="sortbottom"
| style="text-align:center;" colspan="2"| Career
| 54 || 25 || 31.1 || .511 || – || .854 || 3.6 || 1.9 || 1.2 || .7 || 18.6

Notes

References

External links
College statistics

1957 births
2008 deaths
American men's basketball players
Basketball players from Idaho
New York Knicks draft picks
People from Moscow, Idaho
San Diego State Aztecs men's basketball players
Small forwards
Southern Idaho Golden Eagles men's basketball players
Special educators